Nudaria mesombra is a moth of the subfamily Arctiinae. It is found in the Philippines.

References

Nudariina